Shaikh Rashid bin Khalifa Al Khalifa (born 1952) is a member of the Bahraini royal family, an artist and the Chairman of Bahrain's National Council for Arts. He is the first president and the current honorary president of the Bahrain Arts Society. He has painted over a period of 50 years, beginning with landscape painting in the late 1960's. His recent work continues to explore his immediate landscape and the traditional architecture of his homeland, through wall based, structural installations created with aluminium. He is  widely considered one of the Kingdom's most renowned artists.

Biography

Rashid Al Khalifa was born in Riffa in 1952. He is the second son of Shaikh Khalifa bin Hamad Al Khalifa, who was the eighth son of Hamad bin Isa Al Khalifa, the ruler of Bahrain from 1932 until his death in 1942. Rashid was exposed to literature, philosophy and music in high school and his interest in painting was encouraged by the late Emir, Shaikh Isa bin Salman Al Khalifa as well as Shaikh Khalifa bin Salman Al Khalifa, the late Prime Minister of Bahrain (1970-2020), both of whom showed genuine interest in Rashid's work when he participated in a local art exhibition at his high school.

Rashid held his first solo exhibition at the Dilmun Hotel, Bahrain, in 1970 when he was just 18 years old, and then moved to the UK in 1972 to study at the Hastings College of Arts and Technology in Sussex. After returning to Bahrain in 1978, inspired by Europe’s greatest Impressionist masters, he began his own renditions of his country’s landscapes, producing a series of atmospheric paintings of the desert, sea, and historical sites. These works were first presented at the Middle East Institute, Washington, D.C., USA, and at the Sheraton Hotel, Bahrain, in 1982. Rashid developed his painting by responding to certain movements and styles such as geometric abstraction, hard-edge painting and colour field work. In 1983, Rashid and a number of other Bahraini artists, formed the Bahrain Arts Society, a non-profit organization for Bahraini artists, whereby Rashid was named its first president. He continues to hold the title of honorary president. 

The artist’s vital decision to merge elements of his figurative and landscape works in the late 1980s was an entirely conscious one. He was driven by a greater sense of individuality, which emulated the ambiance and aura of his own surroundings. His female figures became barely decipherable, as hints of fabric, suggestions of limbs and movement, and cascades of hair all dispersed into the melding colours of the land. Rashid’s further transformation of his work in the early 1990s denotes his desire to contain and redirect his previously gestural and fleeting. mark making. Gradually becoming more controlled, his imagery began incorporating more decorative elements. This series of works were first presented in 1996 in solo exhibitions at the De Caliet Gallery in Milan, Italy, and the El Kato Kayyel Gallery, Milan, Italy, as well as at the Shuman Arts Organisation in Jordan in 1997. During this time, Rashid also experimented with a shapelier backdrop, forming a triangular prism with three canvases. And while he appreciated its three-dimensionality, which allowed the work to stand unsupported so viewers could look from all angles, he was unsatisfied with the result.

Further investigations and an unintentional discovery resulted in his characteristically ‘convex canvas’ which emerged towards the end of the 1990s. Beginning in 2000, this new canvas became the mainstay on which the artist merged all his imagery - landscape, figurative and abstract expressionism - into his own colour field language. From 2006 onwards, along with his continued application of bright and vivid colour schemes, his practice adopted a conceptual framework. Organic shapes and unusual patterns swirled together, allowing for the emergence of animate and abstract imagery.

By 2009, his work underwent a definitive change, where the formerly bold lines and distinct forms of the late ‘90s became a synthesis of colour and gesture. Broad sweeps of colour met with blended paint and thick impasto which was then scratched and scraped to reveal the remnant hues and imagery beneath the surface. Employing the convex surface for over a decade, Rashid methodically and continually developed his style with a far more minimalistic approach. In 2010, an important solo exhibition at the Bahrain National of his work, presenting his journey with this newfound form and its Museum entitled ‘Convex: A New Perspective’, showcased a decade influential role on his style and practice. Along with his earlier painterly works, he introduced a new series of lacquer paint, fabric and glue complementing the curvature of the canvas. Rashid manipulated these materials to open up opportunities for light to fall differently on and more intense in nature, imparted far greater dramatic effects. In each surface, thereby emphasizing his multilayered relief technique.

The scale of his canvas became grander and the imagery itself, darker essence, this ‘new perspective’ intimated the changes in the physicality of Rashid’s work and ran parallel to his personal growth. His ongoing experimentation signified his need and openness for innovation and renewal. In this phase, Rashid began to consider and equate, to an even greater extent, the susceptibility, mechanics and geometric processes involved in certain aspects of the designs and architecture he visualized in Bahrain’s ever-changing landscapes. He quickly began to incorporate these findings into his practice. The incandescent, smooth lacquer surfaces seen in much of his 2010-2011 work demonstrates his affinity for symmetry and balance in form and purpose. By late 2011, Rashid took this further by experimenting with chrome which allowed him to paint over, manipulate and warp reflections of his environment. This body of work was showcased in solo exhibitions the following year at the Bahrain Financial Harbour, Manama (2012), Beirut Art Fair, Lebanon (2012) and Abu Dhabi Art, UAE (2012).

In May 2015 the artist officially participated in the 56th Venice Biennale, Eye of the Thunderstorm: Effervescent Practices from the Arab World’, in both the ‘Nomi/Names’ joint exhibition and a collateral event, ‘The commissioned by the Contemporary Practices Journal. This was followed with his participation in an Arab delegation of artists to Brazil for the TRIO Biennial dedicated to three-dimensional art. Around this time Rashid’s convex surfaces took on textured layers of aluminium, which he manipulated or excised to reveal layering underneath. In doing so, he abandoned the painterly style of previous years to allow for a pristine and symmetrical façade. These structural features, as well as his move towards minimalism, directed his new focus on elemental forms of design and their receptiveness to light and consequent shadows.

In 2018, the artist presented a solo show at Ayyam Gallery in Dubai, UAE, entitled ‘Hybrids’, which showcased this transition with a selection of works created between 2015-2017. In the same year, this fresh and innovative approach defined his ‘Parametrics’ series of large-scale installations that premiered, to international acclaim, in a major solo exhibition entitled ‘Penumbra: Textured Shadow, Coloured Light’ at the Saatchi Gallery in London. In continuation of this style, in 2019, Rashid exhibited alongside artist Mary Bauermeister and sound artist Simon Stockhausen at the me Collector's Room, Berlin presenting a selection of his parametrics. In 2020, Rizzoli publishing house, released an elegantly illustrated publication of Rashid Al Khalifa's work, entitled, 'Rashid Al Khalifa, Full Circle', showcasing the artists deep connection to the light and landscape of his homeland.

Rashid Al Khalifa’s latest work continues to explore the myriad dynamics of light and colours that are characteristic to Bahrain’s geographical and cultural diversity. His current interests lie in the interaction of these properties to further inform his bold interpretations of his cultural heritage. Through splendidly commanding structures, comprising meticulous forms and complex designs, Rashid’s art practice stands as a contemporary tribute to traditional Middle Eastern design and architecture.

Rashid held a government post as the Undersecretary for Tourism and Archaeology for the Ministry of Culture, Bahrain until June 2011. After the first Gulf War, he was appointed Undersecretary of Immigration, Passports and Residence Affairs. In 2021 he retired from this position and has since been named the Chairman of the newly established National Council for Arts. Al Khalifa is married to Luluwah bint Khalifa bin Salman Al Khalifa, only daughter of Khalifa bin Salman, former Prime Minister of Bahrain. They have six children, three daughters and three sons.

Exhibitions

Solo
2021 Opera Gallery, Dubai, UAE

2021 Tesselate, Mario Mauroner Contemporary Art, Vienna, Austria

2019 In Parallel, Bait Muzna Gallery, Muscat, Oman

2018 Penumbra: Textured Shadow, Coloured Light, Saatchi Gallery, London, UK

Hybrids, Ayyam Gallery, Alserkal Avenue, Dubai, UAE

2012 Reflections, The Waterline Gallery, Bahrain Financial Harbour, Kingdom of Bahrain

2010 Convex: A New Perspective, Bahrain National Museum, Kingdom of Bahrain

1997 Art Department, Shuman Arts Organization, Amman, Jordan

1996 De Caliet Gallery, Milan, Italy

El Kato Kayyel Gallery, Milan, Italy

1982 Middle East Institute, Washington, D.C., USA

Sheraton Hotel, Manama, Kingdom of Bahrain

1970 Dilmun Hotel, Manama, Kingdom of Bahrain

Group 
2019 Transverse Wave, me Collectors Room Berlin / Olbricht Collection, Berlin, Germany

2017 Convergence: Royal Bridges, Ritz Carlton, Dubai, UAE

2013 In Dialogue, The Waterline Gallery, Kingdom of Bahrain

Fairs 
2021 SCOPE International Contemporary Art Show, Miami Beach, Miami, USA

2021 Contemporary Istanbul, Istanbul, Turkey

2019 Contemporary Istanbul, Istanbul, Turkey

2014 WWALA, Los Angeles, USA

Art Dubai, UAE

2013 Zurich Art Fair, Switzerland

Abu Dhabi Art, UAE

Art Dubai, UAE

2012 Abu Dhabi Art, UAE

Beirut Art Fair, Lebanon

Biennals 
2019 Moscow Biennale, New Tretyakov Gallery, Moscow, Russia

2017 Bridges, Grenada Pavilion, 57th Venice Biennale, Italy

Out of Place, 3rd Mediterranean Biennale, Sakhnin Valley, Israel

2015 Arab Delegation, TRIO Biennial, Rio de Janeiro, Brazil

Nomi/Names Official Exhibition, 56th Venice Biennale, Italy

The Eye of the Thunderstorm: Effervescent Practices from the Arab World,

Official Collateral Event, 56th Venice Biennale, Italy

Bahrain Arts Society Participation 
2016 15/15, Shaikh Ebrahim bin Mohammed Al Khalifa Center for Culture and Heritage,

Muharraq, Kingdom of Bahrain

Views, Ritz Carlton, Kingdom of Bahrain

2014 Bahrain, Asilah Arts & Culture Forum, Morocco

2013 Bahrain Contemporary Art, Russian Academy, Moscow, Russia

1996 Europe Art Festival, Geneva, Switzerland

Bahrain Artists Exhibition, Rome, Italy

Sharjah Biennial, UAE

1995 Hotel Du Rond, Geneva, Switzerland

World Trade Center, Lausanne, Switzerland

1989 Bahrain Arts Society Exhibition, Cairo, Egypt

1988 Festival of Asian Artists, Malaysia

New Art Center, Baghdad, Iraq

1986 First GCC Art Exhibition, Tokyo, Japan

1985 Cairo Biennial, Egypt

Alia Center, Amman, Jordan

1984 Bahraini Artists, Leighton House, London, England

Salon des Artistes Français, Grand Palais, Paris, France

2007 Bahrain Contemporary Art, UNESCO, Paris, France

2005 Modern Art Exhibition, Royal Ireland College of Surgeons, Dublin, Ireland

2004 32nd Annual Art Exhibition, Bahrain National Museum, Kingdom of Bahrain

2002 Bahrain Culture Week, Amman, Jordan

Bahrain Culture Week, Peking, China

1999 Taipei Art Exhibition, Taipei, Taiwan

Sharjah Biennial, Sharjah, UAE

Dilmun Exhibition, Paris, France

1998 Bahrain Arts Society Exhibition, Gallery Alexander, Ladoux, France

1997 Art Expo Singapore, Singapore

Art America Exhibition, Miami, USA

Europe Art Festival, Geneva, Switzerland

Bahrain Arts Society Exhibition, Cannes, France

Honours and awards

Honours

National honours

Foreign honours
  Anhaltese Ducal Family: Knight Grand Cross of the Ducal Order of Albert the Bear

Awards
1991 GCC Golden Palm Award Doha
1989 GCC Dana Award Kuwait

References

External links
 

20th-century Bahraini people
20th-century painters
21st-century Bahraini people
21st-century painters
1952 births
Living people
Bahraini artists
Bahraini contemporary artists
House of Khalifa